Thengamam Balakrishnan (April 1, 1927 – July 3, 2013) was an Indian politician, journalist, and leader of Communist Party of India. He was former Chief editor of Janayugom. He represented Adoor constituency in the Kerala Legislative Assembly  from 1970 to 1977.

Biography
He was born as the eldest son of Madhavan and Naniamma of Thengamam on April 1, 1927. Influenced by the freedom movement and national leaders, Thengamam began his public life through All India Students Federation. Even during the student life, he was arrested and suffered police 
brutality for his public activism.

He had served as member of Kerala Public Service Commission, vice-president of Kerala Grandhasala Sangam and editor of Grandalokam.

Thengamam was married to Nirmala, they have two daughters and one son.

He died on July 3, 2013, at the age of 86.

References

1927 births
2013 deaths
Journalists from Kerala
Indian editors
Members of the Kerala Legislative Assembly
People from Pathanamthitta district
20th-century Indian journalists
Indian male journalists
Communist Party of India politicians from Kerala